The Ponca Historic District is a historic district in Ponca, Nebraska that was listed on the National Register of Historic Places in 1979. It includes the commercial center of Ponca, including 38 contributing buildings.

These include:
Ponca City Hall at 123 West 3rd Street.
Salem Lutheran Church, an Akron Plan church (accompanying photos 16, 17, 28, 37 & 38)
Carnegie Library (accompanying photos 13, 14, 15)
First Presbyterian Church, a vernacular brick church
First Methodist Church, also a vernacular brick church
Security Bank (photos 1 & 2)
Bank of Dixon County (photos 3 & 35)

References

External links 
More photos of the Ponca Historic District at Wikimedia Commons

Historic districts on the National Register of Historic Places in Nebraska
Geography of Dixon County, Nebraska
Buildings and structures in Dixon County, Nebraska